ISO 22396:2020 Security and resilience - Community resilience - Guidelines for information exchange between organizations, is an international standard developed by ISO/TC 292 Security and resilience and published by the International Organization for Standardization in 2020: 
ISO 22396 gives various of recommendations on how to exchange information between organizations. It is applicable to all types of organizations, both public and private.  The recommendations include various of principles for information exchange as well as a framework and process on how to work.

Scope and contents 
ISO 22396 includes the following main clauses:
 Scope
 Normative references
 Terms and definitions
 Principles 
 Framework 
 Process 
Annex A Traffic light protocol (TLP) 
Annex B Examples

Related standards
ISO 22396 is part of a series of standards on Community resilience. The other standards are: 
 ISO 22315:2015 Societal security – Mass evacuation – Guidelines for planning
 ISO 22319:2017 Security and resilience – Community resilience – Guidelines for planning the involvement of spontaneous volunteers
 ISO 22392:2020 Security and resilience – Community resilience – Guidelines for conducting peer reviews
 ISO 22395:2018 Security and resilience – Community resilience – Guidelines for supporting vulnerable persons in an emergency

History

See also 
 List of ISO standards
 International Organization for Standardization

References

External links 
 ISO 22396— Security and resilience - Community resilience - Guidelines for information exchange between organizations
 ISO TC 292— Security and resilience
 ISO 22396 at isotc292online.org

22396